Andrés González Jaén (born 21 May 1993), commonly known as Zubi, is a Spanish footballer who plays for Cacereño as a left winger.

Club career
Zubi was born in Cáceres, Extremadura. He played youth football with Real Valladolid, making his debut as a senior in the 2012–13 season with the reserves in Tercera División. 

On 30 October 2013 Zubi made his first team – and La Liga – debut, playing the last two minutes in a 2–2 home draw against Real Sociedad. On 17 July of the following year he moved to another reserve team, Atlético Madrid B in Segunda División B.

References

External links

1993 births
Living people
People from Cáceres, Spain
Sportspeople from the Province of Cáceres
Spanish footballers
Footballers from Extremadura
Association football wingers
La Liga players
Segunda División B players
Tercera División players
Real Valladolid Promesas players
Real Valladolid players
Atlético Madrid B players
CF Rayo Majadahonda players
CP Cacereño players